Saint-Jacques-le-Majeur-de-Wolfestown is a parish municipality in Les Appalaches Regional County Municipality in the Chaudière-Appalaches region of Quebec, Canada. Its population is 189 as of the Canada 2011 Census.

It was named after one of Jesus' first disciples, James, son of Zebedee. Wolfestown was the name of the historic township in which it is located, which was named after General James Wolfe.

Demographics 

References

External links

Parish municipalities in Quebec
Incorporated places in Chaudière-Appalaches